Diodora edwardsi is a species of sea snail, a marine gastropod mollusk in the family Fissurellidae, the keyhole limpets.

Description
The size of the shell reaches 13 mm.

Distribution
This species was found on the Porcupine Bank, northeast Atlantic Ocean, and at bathyal depths off the Azores.

References

External links
 

Fissurellidae
Gastropods described in 1896